Bowkan may refer to:
Bala Bowkan, a village in Afghanistan
Pa'in Bowkan, a village in Afghanistan